The following are the association football events of the year 2005 throughout the world.

Events
January 21 – German referee Robert Hoyzer admits to having accepted large sums of money from a gambling syndicate to fix matches. The resulting scandal was a major embarrassment to Germany as it prepared to host the 2006 FIFA World Cup. Eventually Hoyzer would be sentenced to two years and five months in prison.
February 3 – Dutch club Fortuna Sittard has three points deducted for financial mismanagement (failure to settle tax debts); an additional deduction of three points on April 29 was confirmed after an appeal on June 13.
February 4 – Swiss AXPO Super League – Club Servette FC was declared bankrupt. It had run debts of over 10 million Swiss francs. As a consequence of the bankruptcy the club will be demoted two divisions.
March 20 – Dutch club Go Ahead Eagles has three points deducted for financial mismanagement.
March 26 – Chelsea won the League Cup after beating Liverpool 3–2
April 23 – PSV wins its 18th national title in the Dutch Eredivisie.
April 30 – National Football title assignment in two major European tournaments. In England, Chelsea wins for the second time in the FA Premier League; in Germany, Bundesliga is won for the 19th time by Bayern Munich. In France, RC Strasbourg won second League Cup.
May 8 – Ligue 1 – Lyon win its fourth French title in 2000s (decade).
May 14 – Spain Liga – FC Barcelona won its 17th league title.
May 18 – UEFA Cup Final – CSKA Moscow became the first Russian club to win a major European club competition, defeating Sporting CP 3–1 at Sporting's home field in Lisbon.
May 20 – Italian Serie A – Juventus won its 28th title ("scudetto") without playing following a 3–3 draw between A.C. Milan and Palermo.
May 21 – Manager Gert Aandewiel receives the Rinus Michels Award for the best coach in Dutch amateur football.
May 21 – Arsenal wins the FA Cup Final by defeating Manchester United 5–4 on penalties after regular time and extra time ended 0–0.
May 25 – 2004–05 UEFA Champions League Final – Liverpool come from three goals down, and beat A.C. Milan 3–2 on penalties after a 3–3 draw in Istanbul to win Europe's top prize for the 5th time.
May 26 – Dutch club Sparta Rotterdam fires manager Mike Snoei and names former international Adri van Tiggelen as interim-coach.
June 8 – Goalkeeper and captain Edwin van der Sar plays his 100th international match for the Netherlands, when the side defeats Finland (0–4) in Helsinki.
July 9 – Spain's Basque Country wins the fourth UEFA Regions' Cup, beating Bulgaria's South-West Sofia 1–0 in Proszowice.
July 14 – 2005 Copa Libertadores is won by São Paulo FC after defeating Clube Atlético Paranaense on an aggregate score of 5–1.
August 5 – Ajax wins the Johan Cruijff Schaal, the annual opening of the new season in the Eredivisie, by a 2–1 win over PSV in the Amsterdam ArenA.
August 26 – The first match of the inaugural Hyundai A-League in Australia was played.
August 31 – Boca Juniors (Argentina) won the Recopa Sudamericana 2005 4–3 on aggregate over Once Caldas (Colombia). (First leg in Buenos Aires 3–1, second leg in Manizales 1–2)
November 21 – Head coach Robert Maaskant is fired by Willem II.
December 9 – 2006 FIFA World Cup group assignments for the finals in Germany announced.
December 11 – Opening game of the second FIFA World Club Championship, a six team tournament replacing the former Intercontinental Cup. In the final one week later Brazilian team São Paulo FC won the competition narrowly beating UEFA Champions Liverpool 1–0.
December 18 – Boca Juniors defeated UNAM Pumas on penalties after the second leg game for the Copa Sudamericana 2005.
December 19 – Manager Cees Lok leaves NEC and is replaced by another former player of the Dutch Club, Ron de Groot.
December 19 – Ronaldinho (Brazil, for male footballer) and Birgit Prinz (Germany, for female footballer) were elected FIFA World Player of the Year.
December 31 – Mark Wotte resigns as technical director of Feyenoord.

Winners national championships

National club championships in Africa (CAF)
:
Algerian Championnat National – USM Alger
Algerian Cup – ASO Chlef
:
Girabola – Grupo Desportivo Sagrada Esperança
Angolan Cup – Atlético Sport Aviação
Benin:
Benin Premier League – not playing
Botswana:
Mascom Premier League and FA Challenge Cup – Township Rollers Gaborone
Burkina Faso:
Burkinabé Premier League – Rail Club du Kadiogo
Burkina Faso Cup – Union Sportive de Ouagadougou
Burundi:
Burundi Premier League – InterStar Bujumbura
Cameroon:
Cameroon Premiere Division – Cotonsport Garoua
Cameroon Cup – Imports FC Yaoundé
Cape Verde:
Premier League – Derby FC Mindelo
Central African Republic:
Central African Republic League – Anges de Fatima
Chad:
Chad Premier League – Renaissance FC
Comoros:
Comoros Premier League – Coin Nord Mitsamiouli
Congo:
Congo Premier League – not assigned
Congolan Cup – Diables Noirs Brazzaville
Congo DR:
Linafoot – DC Motema Pembe
Republic of Congo Cup – AS Vita Kabasha
Djibouti:
Premier League – AS Compagnie Djibouti-Ethiopie
Djiboutian Cup – Poste de Djibouti
Egypt:
Egyptian Premier League and Super Cup – Al-Ahly
Egyptian Soccer Cup – ENPPI
Equatorial Guinea
Equatoguinean Premier League – Renacimiento FC
Eritrea:
Premier League – Red Sea FC Asmara
Ethiopia:
Premier League – Saint George SA Addis Abeba
Ethiopian Cup – Awassa Kenema
Gabon:
Premier League and Cup – AS Mangasport Moanda
Gambia:
Premier League – Wallidan Banjul
Gambian Cup – Bakan United
Ghana:
Ghana Telecom Premier League – Accra Hearts of Oak Sporting Club
Ghanaian Cup – Asante Kotoko
Guinea:
Premier League – Satellite FC Conakry
Guinean Cup – AS Kaloum Stars Conakry
Guinea Bissau:
Premier League – Sporting Clube de Bissau
Ivory Coast:
Premier League and Cup – ASEC Mimosas
Kenya:
Premier League – Ulinzi Stars
Kenyan Cup – World Hope
Lesotho:
Premier League – Likohpo Masem
Liberia:
Premier League and Cup – LPRC Oilers Monrovia
Libya:
Premier League and Cup – Al Ittihad
Madagascar:
Premier League and Cup – USCA Foot
Malawi:
Premier League – not playing
Mali:
Premier League – Stade Malien Bamako
Malian Cup – AS Bamako
Mauritania:
Mauritanean Premier League – ASC Nasr de Sebkha
Mauritanean Cup – ASC Entente 
Mauritius:
Premier League and Cup – AS Port-Louis 2000
Morocco:
Premier League – FAR Rabat
Moroccan Cup – Raja Casablanca
Mozambique:
Moçambola – Ferroviário de Maputo
Taça de Moçambique – Ferroviário de Beira
Namibia:
Premier League – Civics FC Windhoek
Namibian Cup – Ramblers Windhoek
Niger:
Premier League – unknown
Nigeria:
Premier League and Cup – Enyimba FC Aba
Rwanda:
Premier League – APR FC Kigat
Rwandan Cup – Rayon Sports Butare
São Tomé and Príncipe:
Premier League – not held
Senegal:
Premier League – ASC Port Autonome Dakar
Senegal Cup – AS Donanes Dakar
Seychelles:
Premier League – La Passe FC
Seychelles Cup – Seychelles Marketing Board
Sierra Leone:
Premier League – East End Lions Freetown
Somalia:
Premier League – not held
South Africa:
Premier Soccer League – Kaizer Chiefs Football Club
Sudan:
Premier League – Al Hilal Omdurman
Swaziland:
Premier League – Green Mamba Big Bend
Swazilandian Cup – Hub Sundowns
Tanzania:
Premier League – Young Africans Dar es Salaam
Togo:
Premier League – AS Douanes Lomé
Togolese Cup – Dynamic Tongolais Lomé
Tunisia:
Premier League – Sfaxien FC
Tunisian Cup – ES Zarzis
Uganda:
Premier League – Police FC Jinja
Uganda Cup – Uganda Revenus Authority SC Kampala
Zambia:
Premier League – Zanaco Lusaka
Zimbabwe:
Premier League – CAPS United Harare

National club championships in Asia (AFC)
:
Premier League – Riffa Club
Bahrain Cup – Al Muharraq Club
:
Premier League – Mohammeddan SC Dhaka
:
Premier League – Transport United
:
Chinese Super League – Dalian Shide
:
HKFA Coolpoint Ventilation First Division League and HKFA Cup – Xiangxue Sun Hei
:
NFL – Dempo Sports Club
Durand Cup – Mahindra United
:
Premier League – Persipura Jayapura
Indonesian Cup – Arema Malang
:
Iran's Premier Football League – Foolad Ahvaz
Azadegan League – Shahid Ghandi Yazd
Hazfi Cup – Saba Battery Tehran
:
Iraq Super League – Al Quwa Al Jawiya
:
J.League Division 1 – Gamba Osaka
J.League Cup – JEF United Ichihara Chiba
Emperor's Cup – Urawa Reds (played 1 January 2006)
:
Premier League – Al Wahdat Al Quwaysinah
Jordanian Cup – Al Faysali Amman
:
Premier League and Cup – Dordoy Dinamo Naryn
:
Premier League – Al Qadisiya
Kuwaitian Cup – Al Arabi
:
Premier League – Vientiane FC
:
Premier League – Al Nejmeh
Lebanon Cup – Al Ansar
:
Premier League – Policia de Segurança Pública
:
Super League – Perlis FA Kangar
Premier League and Cup – Selangor MPPJ Kelana Jaya
:
Premier League – Khoromkon Ulan Baatov
:
Premier League – Finance and Revenue Yangon
:
Premier League and Cup – Dhofar Salala
:
Premier League – Pakistan Army Rawalpindi
:
Premier League – Al Gharrafa
Qatarian Cup – Al Sadd
:
Premier League – Al Hilal Riyad
:
S.League – Tampines Rovers FC
Singapore Cup – Home United FC
:
Premier League – Saunders SC
Sri Lanka Cup – Ratnam SC
:
Samsung Hauzen 2005 K-League – Ulsan Hyundai Horang-i
Samsung 2005 Hauzen Cup – Suwon Samsung Bluewings
Korean FA Cup – Chonbuk Hyundai Motors
:
Premier League and Cup – Al Ittihad Alep
:
Premier League – Tatung
:
Premier League – Thailand Tobacco Monopoly
:
Premier League – Al Wahda Abu Dhabi
UAE Cup – Al Ayn Club
:
Premier League and Cup – Paktakor Tashkent
:
Premier League and Cup – Gach Dong Tam Long An
:
Premier League – Al Tilal Aden
Yemenites Cup – Al Hilal Hudaydah

National club championships in Europe (UEFA)
:
Superliga and Supercup – SK Tiranë
Albanian Cup – KS Teuta Durrës
:
Primera División – UE Sant Julià
Copa Constitució and Supercopa – Santa Coloma
:
Armenian Premier League – Pyunik
Armenian Cup – MIKA
:
Bundesliga – Rapid Wien
Austrian Cup – Austria Wien
:
AFFA Supreme League – Neftchi Baku
Azerbaijan Cup – FK Baku
:
Belarusian Premier League – FC Shakhtyor Soligorsk
Belarusian Cup – MTZ-RIPO Minsk
: for fuller coverage, see: 2004–05 in Belgian football
Jupiler League and Supercup – Club Brugge
Belgian Cup – Germinal Beerschot
:
Premier League – NK Zrinjski Mostar
Bosnia and Herzegovina Cup – FK Sarajevo
:
Bulgarian A Professional Football Group – CSKA Sofia
Bulgarian Cup and Supercup – PFC Levski Sofia
:
Prva HNL and Croatian Supercup – Hajduk Split
Croatian Cup – NK Rijeka
:
Cypriot First Division – Anorthosis Famagusta
Cypriot Cup and Supercup – Omonia Nicosia
:
Gambrinus liga – Sparta Prague
Czech Cup – Baník Ostrava
: for fuller coverage, see: 2004–05 in Danish football
Superliga and DONG Cup – Brøndby
: for fuller coverage, see: 2004–05 in English football
Premiership and League Cup – Chelsea
FA Cup – Arsenal
:
Meistriliiga – FC TVMK Tallinn
Esiliiga – JK Vaprus Pärnu, FC Levadia Tallinn, FC Ajax Lasnamäe
Estonian Cup – FC Levadia Tallinn
:
1. Deild – B36 Tórshavn
Faroe Islands Cup – GÍ Gøta
:
Veikkausliiga – MyPa 47 Anjalankoski
Finnish Cup – FC Haka Valkeakoski
Finnish League Cup – AC Allianssii Vantaa
:
Ligue 1 – Lyon
French Cup – Auxerre
French League Cup – Strasbourg
:
Georgian Premier League – FC Dinamo Tbilisi
Georgian Cup – FC Lokomotivi Tbilisi
:
Bundesliga and German Cup – Bayern Munich
:
Greek National Division and Greek Cup – Olympiacos
:
Arany Ászok Liga – Debreceni VSC
Hungarian Cup – Mátav FC Sopron
:
Icelandic Premier League – FH
Icelandic Cup – Valur
Icelandic League Cup – KR
:
League of Ireland and Munster Senior Cup – Cork City
FAI Cup – Drogheda United
League of Ireland Cup – Derry City
:
Israeli Football Leagues
Israeli Premier League – Maccabi Haifa
Liga Leumit – Hapoel Kfar Saba
Liga Artzit – Hapoel Ashkelon
Toto Cup – Hapoel Petah Tikva (Al), Maccabi Natanya (Leumit) and Hapoel Ashkelon (Artzit)
Israel State Cup – Maccabi Tel Aviv
:
Serie A – Juventus (stripped of title on July 14, 2006) see also 2004–05 Serie A and 2006 Serie A scandal
Italian Cup – Internazionale
Italian Super Cup – A.C. Milan
:
Kazakhstan Super League – FC Aktobe-Lento
Kazakhstan Cup – FC Zhenis Astana
:
Virsliga – FK Liepājas Metalurgs
Latvian Cup – FK Ventspils
:
Liechtenstein Football Cup – FC Vaduz
:
Lithuanian Premier League – FK Ekranas
Lithuanian Cup – FBK Kaunas
:
Premier League – F91 Dudelange
Cup – CS Pétange
:
Macedonian First League – FK Rabotnički Kometal Skopje
Macedonian Cup – FK Bashkimi Kumanovo
:
Maltese Football League and Supercup – Sliema Wanderers
Maltese Cup – Birkirkara F.C.
:
Moldavian Premier League – FC Sheriff Tiraspol
Moldavian Cup – FC Nistru Otaci

Eredivisie and KNVB Cup – PSV
Eerste Divisie – Heracles Almelo
:
Irish Premier League and Irish League Cup – Glentoran F.C.
Irish Cup – Portadown F.C.
Setanta Cup – Linfield F.C.
: for fuller coverage, see: 2005 in Norwegian football
Tippeligaen – Vålerenga
Norwegian Cup – Molde
:
Ekstraklasa – Wisła Kraków
Puchar Polski – Dyskobolia Grodzisk Wielkopolski
:
SuperLiga – Benfica
Cup of Portugal – Vitória Setúbal
: for fuller coverage, see: 2004–05 in Romanian football
Romanian Premier League – Steaua București
Romanian Cup and Romanian Super Cup – Dinamo București
: for fuller coverage, see: 2005 in Russian football
Russian Premier League and Russian Cup – CSKA Moscow
:
Premier League – F.C. Domagnano
Titano Cup – S.S. Pennarossa Chiesanuova
Supercup – S.P. Tre Penne Serravalle
: for fuller coverage, see: 2004–05 in Scottish football
Scottish Premier League and League Cup – Rangers
Scottish Cup – Celtic
:
Meridian Superliga – FK Partizan Belgrade
Serbia and Montenegro Cup – FK Voždovac Belgrade
:
Slovakian Premier League – FC Artmedia Bratislava
Slovakian Cup – FK Dukla Banská Bystrica
:
Slovenian PrvaLiga – Gorica
Slovenian Cup – NK Publikum Celje
:
La Liga – Barcelona
Copa del Rey – Real Betis
: for fuller coverage, see: 2005 in Swedish football
Allsvenskan and Svenska Cupen – Djurgårdens IF
:
AXPO Super League and Swisscom Cup – FC Basel
:
Premier Super League – Fenerbahçe
Turkish Cup – Galatasaray
:
Ukrainian Premier League – FC Shakhtar Donetsk
Ukrainian Cup – FC Dynamo Kyiv
:
League of Wales and Welsh Cup – Total Network Solutions
FAW Premier Cup – Swansea City

National club championships in North and Central America (CONCACAF)
:
Premier League – Bassa FC All Saint's Village
:
Premier League – SV Britannia
:
Premier League – Caledonia Celtic
:
Premier League – Notre Dame SC Bayville
:
Cingular Wireless Premier Division – Devonshire Cougars
Bermudian Football Cup – North Village Rams
:
CPSL – Oakville Blue Deville
Cascadia Cup – Vancouver Whitecaps
:
Premier League – Western Union FC George Town
:
Primera División – Liga Deportiva Alajuelense
:
Premier League – Villa Clara
:
Premier League – RC Grand Bazaar Dublanc
:
Salvadoran Primera División
2004–05 Clausura – Club Deportivo Futbolistas Asociados Santanecos, Santa Ana
2005–06 Apertura – Club Deportivo Vista Hermosa
:
Premier League – ASOMS Paradise
:
Premier League – Deportivo Municipal
:
Premier League – AS Mirebalais
:
Liga Nacional de Fútbol de Honduras
2004–05 Clausura – Olimpia
2005–06 Apertura – Olimpia
:
Wray & Nephew National Premier League – Portmore United F.C.
:
Mexican Primera División
2004–05 Apertura – Club Universidad Nacional
2004–05 Clausura – Club América
:
Premier League – FC Diriangén Diriamba
:
Premier League – CD Plaza Amador Panama
Premier League – San Francisco
:
Premier League – Northern United Gros Islet
:
Premier League – SV Robinhood
:
MLS Cup and U.S. Open Cup – Los Angeles Galaxy

National club championships in Oceania (OFC)
:
A-League – not playing
:
NZFC – Auckland City FC
Chatham Cup – Central United

National club championships in South America (CONMEBOL)
:
Primera División
2004–05 Clausura – Vélez Sársfield
2005–06 Apertura – Boca Juniors
:
Liga de Fútbol Profesional Boliviano
2004–05 Adecuaciòn – Club Bolívar
2004–05 Apertura – Blooming
:
Campeonato Brasileiro Série A – Corinthians
Copa do Brasil – Paulista F.C.
:
Liga Chilena de Fútbol: Primera División
2004–05 Apertura – Unión Española
2004–05 Clausura – Club Deportivo Universidad Católica

Mustang Cup
2004–05 Apertura – Atlético Nacional
2004–05 Clausura – Deportivo Cali
:
Serie A de Ecuador
Apertura – Liga Deportiva Universitaria de Quito
Clausura – Club Deportivo El Nacional
:
Liga Paraguaya – Cerro Porteño
:
Peruvian Primera División – Sporting Cristal
:
Primera División Uruguaya – Club Nacional de Football
:
Primera División Venezolana – Unión Atlético Maracaibo

National club championships in non-FIFA-affiliated French dependencies
 (CONCACAF)
Premier League – Association Sportive Le Gosier
 (CONCACAF)
Premier League – ASC Le Geldar Kourou
 (AFC)
Premier League – AS Tefana Faa'a
Cup – AS Manu Ura Paea
 (CONCACAF)
Premier League and Cup – Club Franciscain Le François
 (OFC)
Premier League and Cup – AS Magenta Nickel Nouméa
 Réunion (CAF):
Premier League – US Stade Tamponnaise Le Tampon
Réunion Cup – SS Excelsior Saint-Joseph

International tournaments
February 3–12: CEMAC Cup 2005 – Winner: Cameroon (Participating countries: Cameroon, Chad, Gabon, Congo, Equatorial Guinea and Central African Republic)
February 8–9: Cyprus International Tournament 2005 – Winner: Finland (Participating countries: Finland, Cyprus, Latvia, Austria)
February 9: Carlsberg Cup 2005 – Winner: Brazil (Participating countries: Brazil and Hong Kong)
 UNCAF Nations Cup in Guatemala City, Guatemala (February 19 – 27, 2005)
 
 
 
February 20–24: CONCACAF Gold Cup 2005 Caribbean Preliminary Competition – Winners: Cuba, Jamaica and Trinidad and Tobago (Participating Countries: Barbados, Cuba, Jamaica and Trinidad and Tobago)
February 26 – August 14: Cosafa Castle Cup 2005 (Participating countries: Group A: South Africa, Mauritius, Madagascar and Seychelles Group B: Botswana, Namibia, Mozambique and Zimbabwe Group C: Lesotho, Malawi, Swaziland and Zambia)
March 5–13: East Asian Football Championships 2005 Preliminary Competition – Winner: North Korea (Participating Countries: North Korea, Hong Kong, Chinese Taipei, Mongolia and Guam)
 Baltic Cup in Kaunas (May 21, 2005)
 
 
UEFA Women's Championship in England (June 5–19, 2005)
 
 
 FIFA U-20 World Cup in Netherlands (June 10 – July 2, 2005)
 
 
 
 FIFA Confederations Cup in Germany (June 15–29, 2005)
 
 
 
 CONCACAF Gold Cup in United States (July 6–24, 2005)
 
 
 East Asian Football Championship in Chinese Taipei & South Korea
 
 
 FIFA U-17 World Championship in Peru (September 16 – October 2, 2005)
 
 
 
 2005 South Asian Football Federation Gold Cup in Pakistan (7 Dec 2005 – 17 Dec 2005)

Qualifying for 2006 World Cup

Note: for fuller coverage, see: 2006 FIFA World Cup (qualification)
October 2004 – October 2005: Africa Qualifying
Qualified teams : Angola, Ghana, Ivory Coast, Togo, Tunisia
Participating countries: Algeria, Angola, Benin, Botswana, Burkina Faso, Burundi, Cameroon, Cape Verde, Central African Republic, Chad, Congo, Congo DR, Djibouti, Egypt, Equatorial Guinea, Eritrea, Ethiopia, Gabon, Gambia, Ghana, Guinea, Guinea-Bissau, Ivory Coast, Kenya, Lesotho, Liberia, Libya, Madagascar, Malawi, Mali, Mauritania, Mauritius, Morocco, Mozambique, Namibia, Niger, Nigeria, Rwanda, Senegal, Seychelles, Sierra Leone, Somalia, South Africa, Sudan, Swaziland, São Tomé e Príncipe, Tanzania, Togo, Tunisia, Uganda, Zambia and Zimbabwe
November 2003 – August 2005: Asia Qualifying
Qualified teams: Iran, Japan, Saudi Arabia, South Korea
Participating countries: Afghanistan, Bahrain, Bangladesh, Bhutan, Brunei, Cambodia, China, Chinese Taipei, Guam, Hong Kong, India, Indonesia, Iran, Iraq, Japan, Jordan, North Korea, South Korea, Kuwait, Kyrgyzstan, Laos, Lebanon, Macau, Malaysia, Maldives, Mongolia, Myanmar, Nepal, Oman, Pakistan, Palestine, Philippines, Qatar, Saudi Arabia, Singapore, Sri Lanka, Syria, Tajikistan, Thailand, Turkmenistan, UAE, Uzbekistan, Vietnam and Yemen
February 2004 – October 2005: CONCACAF Qualifying
Qualified teams : USA, Mexico, Costa Rica, Trinidad and Tobago (defeated Bahrain in an inter-regional playoff)
Participating countries: Anguilla, Antigua and Barbuda, Aruba, Bahamas, Barbados, Belize, Bermuda, British Virgin Islands, Canada, Cayman Islands, Costa Rica, Cuba, Dominica, Dominican Republic, El Salvador, Grenada, Guatemala, Guyana, Haiti, Honduras, Jamaica, Mexico, Montserrat, Netherlands Antilles, Nicaragua, Panama, Puerto Rico, St. Kitts and Nevis, St. Lucia, St. Vincent and the Grenadines, Surinam, Trinidad and Tobago, Turks and Caicos, US Virgin Islands and USA
August 2004 – October 2005: Europe Qualifying
Automatic qualifiers: Germany (as hosts)
Qualified teams : Group winners Croatia, England, France, Italy, Netherlands, Portugal, Serbia and Montenegro, Ukraine; two best second-place sides Poland, Sweden; playoff winners Czech Republic, Spain, Switzerland
Participating countries: Albania, Andorra, Armenia, Austria, Azerbaijan, Belarus, Belgium, Bosnia-Herzegovina, Bulgaria, Croatia, Cyprus, Czech Republic, Denmark, England, Estonia, Faroe Islands, Finland, France, Germany, Georgia, Greece, Hungary, Iceland, Republic of Ireland, Israel, Italy, Kazakhstan, Latvia, Liechtenstein, Lithuania, Luxembourg, Republic of Macedonia, Malta, Moldova, Netherlands, Northern Ireland, Norway, Poland, Portugal, Romania, Russia, San Marino, Scotland, Serbia and Montenegro, Slovakia, Slovenia, Spain, Sweden, Switzerland, Turkey, Ukraine and Wales
May 2004 – September 2005: Oceania Qualifying
Qualified team: Australia (defeated Uruguay on penalty kicks in an inter-regional playoff)
Participating countries: American Samoa, Australia, Cook Islands, Fiji, New Caledonia, New Zealand, Papua New Guinea, Samoa, Solomon Islands, Tahiti, Tonga and Vanuatu
September 2003 – October 2005: South America Qualifying
Qualified teams : Argentina, Brazil, Ecuador, Paraguay
Participating countries: Argentina, Bolivia, Brazil, Chile, Colombia, Ecuador, Paraguay, Peru, Uruguay and Venezuela

National team results

Europe







South America





Movies
Real, The Movie

Deaths

January
 January 6 – Jean-Luc Fugaldi (59), French footballer
 January 8 – Suvad Katana (35), Bosnia-Herzegovina footballer
 January 17 – Youssouf Samiou (17), Benin footballer
 January 18 – Bernard Béreau (64), French footballer

February
 February 14 – Ron Burgess (87), Welsh footballer and coach
 February 17 – Omar Sívori (69), Argentinian-Italian footballer
 February 24 – Thadée Cisowski (78), French footballer

March
 March 3 – Rinus Michels (77), Dutch footballer and manager
 March 9 – István Nyers (80), Hungarian-French footballer
 March 15 – Armand Seghers (78), Belgian footballer
 March 15 – Bill McGarry (77), English footballer and manager

April
 April 3 – Kader Firoud (85), French footballer and manager
 April 8 – Maurice Lafont (78), French footballer
 April 11 – Lucien Laurent (97), French footballer

May
 May 5 – Willy Steffen (80), Swiss footballer
 May 7 – Otilino Tenorio (25), Ecuadorian footballer
 May 8 – Gianpietro Zappa (49), Swiss footballer
 May 8 – Wolfgang Blochwitz (64), German footballer
 May 23 – Sígfrid Gràcia (73), Spanish footballer
 May 29 – Gé van Dijk (81), Dutch footballer and manager
 May 29 – Svatopluk Pluskal (74), Czech footballer

June
 June 25 – Hugo Cunha (28), Portugal footballer

July
 July 26 – Mario David (71), Italian footballer
 July 28 – Jair da Rosa Pinto, Brazilian midfielder, runner-up at the 1950 FIFA World Cup. (84)

August
 August 16 – Michel Pavic (83), Yugoslavian footballer and coach
 August 19 – Oscar Muller (48), French footballer

September
 September 8 – Noel Cantwell (72), Northern Ireland footballer and coach
 September 12 – Alain Polaniok (47), French footballer and coach
 September 13 – Toni Fritsch (60), Austrian footballer (later an American football placekicker)
 September 27 – Karl Decker (84), Austrian footballer and coach
 September 28 – Enric Gensana (69), Spanish footballer

October
 October 3 – Francesco Scoglio (64), Italian coach
 October 9 – Sergio Cervato (76), Italian footballer
 October 17 – Carlos Gomes (73), Portuguese footballer
 October 18 – Johnny Haynes (71), English footballer
 October 26 – George Swindin (90), English footballer

November
 November 2 – Ferruccio Valcareggi (86), Italian footballer and coach of Italy national football team
 November 9 – Marceau Sommerlynck (83), French footballer
 November 14 – Erich Schanko (86), German footballer
 November 25 – George Best (59), Northern Ireland footballer
 November 29 – David di Tommaso (26), French footballer

References

 
Association football by year